These are the results of the men's K-1 slalom competition in canoeing at the 2000 Summer Olympics. The K-1 (kayak single) event is raced by one-man kayaks through a whitewater course. The venue for the 2000 Olympic competition was in Penrith.

Medalists

Results

Qualifying
The 23 competitors each took two runs through the whitewater slalom course on 19 September. The combined score of both runs counted for the event with the top 15 advancing to the final round the following day.

Final
15 competitors each took two runs through the whitewater slalom course on 20 September. The combined result of both runs counted for the event.

References

2000 Summer Olympics Canoe slalom results. 
Sports-reference.com 2000 men's K-1 slalom results.
Wallechinsky, David and Jaime Loucky (2008). "Canoeing: Men's Kayak Slalom Singles". In The Complete Book of the Olympics: 2008 Edition. London: Aurum Press Limited. p. 485.

Men's Slalom K-1
Men's events at the 2000 Summer Olympics